Ortholinea is a genus of cnidarians belonging to the family Ortholineidae.

The species of this genus are found in Europe and Northern America.

Species:

Ortholinea divergens 
Ortholinea fluviatilis 
Ortholinea gobiusi 
Ortholinea macrouri 
Ortholinea orientalis 
Ortholinea sakinachanumae

References

Cnidarian genera
Ortholineidae